The M69 81 mm/82 mm medium weight mortar is a Yugoslavian-designed smooth bore, muzzle-loading, high-angle-of-fire weapon used for long-range indirect fire support to light infantry.

Variants
 M69 & M69A - original variant in 82mm caliber
 M69B - NATO version using 81mm caliber
 M96 - improved version of the M69 in 82mm caliber

Operators

  - M69 82mm mortar
  - M69 82mm mortar
  - M69 82mm mortar
  - M69B 81mm mortar  
  - M69 82mm mortar  
  - M69A 82mm mortar
  - M69 82mm mortar

See also
 Artillery
 Military technology and equipment
 List of artillery

References

Mortars of Yugoslavia